Ondrej Otčenáš (born 6 March 1987) is a Slovak former professional ice hockey player who played predominantly in the Slovak Extraliga (Slovak).  He was drafted 123rd overall in the 2005 NHL Entry Draft by the Carolina Hurricanes.

Career statistics

Regular season and playoffs

International

References

External links

1987 births
Living people
Carolina Hurricanes draft picks
HKM Zvolen players
MHC Martin players
Plymouth Whalers players
Slovak ice hockey forwards
HK Dukla Trenčín players
Sportspeople from Piešťany
Slovak expatriate ice hockey players in the Czech Republic
Slovak expatriate ice hockey players in the United States